The Cobble Hill station is located in Cobble Hill, British Columbia. The station was a flag stop on Via Rail's Dayliner service. The station and line closed in 2011 due to poor track conditions.

References 

Via Rail stations in British Columbia
Disused railway stations in Canada